The Centenary Trophy was an association football friendly tournament organised in Spain by the Catalan Football Federation in which the Catalonia national team played against Basque Country national team. It was created in 2014 and was played in December of that year, and in December 2015.

History
Since the 1990s, both the Basque Country and Catalonia international teams (which hold unofficial status) typically organised a friendly match each year, often during Spanish football's short break around Christmas. In December 2014, Catalonia travelled to Biscay to play against the Basque Country, arranging both men's and women's fixtures to commemorate the first meetings between the men's teams 100 years earlier in January 1915 (although this was not advertised as the first in a 'double-header' at that time). It was the 12th match overall between them, in contrast to the women's teams who had never played each other before.

Both 2014 matches ended in 1–1 draws. Repeats were scheduled for the following year, this time in Barcelona, now billed as the return leg of a Centenary Trophy between the sides. Cups were commissioned for the champions, and it was confirmed that penalties would decide the winner if necessary. The Basque teams emerged as narrow victors in both genders: 1–0 in the men's match and 4–3 on penalties in the women's match following another 1–1 draw.

Results

Men's

Women's

See also
Catalonia International Trophy

References

External links
Catalan Football Federation's official website 
Basque Football Federation's official website 

Basque football competitions
Recurring sporting events established in 2014
2014 establishments in Spain
Catalan football friendly trophies
Spanish football friendly trophies
International association football competitions hosted by Spain
Catalonia national football team
Basque Country national football team
2014 in women's association football
2014–15 in Spanish football
2015 in women's association football
2015–16 in Spanish football